Grethe Whitehead (24 June 1914 – April 2000) was a British hurdler. She competed in the women's 80 metres hurdles at the 1936 Summer Olympics.

References

1914 births
2000 deaths
Athletes (track and field) at the 1936 Summer Olympics
British female hurdlers
Olympic athletes of Great Britain
Place of birth missing